Oy Tampella Ab was a Finnish heavy industry manufacturer, a maker of paper machines, locomotives, military weaponry, as well as wood-based products such as packaging. The company was based mainly in the Naistenlahti district of the city of Tampere.

Until 1963 the company was called Tampereen Pellava- ja Rauta-Teollisuus Osake-Yhtiö (The Flax and Iron Industry of Tampere Stock Company). In Swedish it was called Tammerfors Linne-&Jern-Manufakt.A.B.. In 1993 the company’s forest and packaging business was bought by Enso-Gutzeit Oy.

Tampereen Pellava- ja Rautateollisuus Oy was a company based on the merger in 1861 of two factories - a linen mill and foundry - situated by the Tammerkoski rapids. After a modest start it grew to become an institution employing thousands of people in the centre of Tampere alone, and more in its other units. In the 1950s the company's name was shortened to Tampella. The company went into decline during the 1980s and eventually went bankrupt in 1990. This was at a time just before the economic recession of the early 1990s. After bankruptcy the company's operations were split and sold to various, mostly international, owners.

Among the company's products was the manufacture of linen: in later times this was not an important product, but the company continued it for apparently historic reasons. However, its main concern was iron and steel products. These included grave crosses (in the very early days), guns, mining drills, paper machines, locomotives (both steam and diesel), steam boilers and turbines. The company also produced cardboard and packaging at its Inkeroinen mill.

The industrial activity, under the new ownership, in the centre of Tampere gradually ceased and the machines finally stopped operating in 2000. Soon after this many of the buildings in the industrial complex have been taken into new uses as museums, cultural centres, artist's workshops etc. though some had already been demolished. Other buildings were converted to new commercial uses, but many were demolished to make way for blocks of flats.

Together with an Israeli cooperative organisation Solel Boneh, Tampella also founded the Israeli defence contractor Soltam, in 1950.

Weaponry

Field cannons
122K/60, 122 mm field cannon, prototype 122K/57, 15 pieces of 122K/60 manufactured. The Israeli Soltam company became interested and the 152HX-K60 was developed
152HX-K60
155HX, 24 November 1971, 2 pieces, at least one of them was delivered to Soltam, Israel
155KAN68, manufactured for Soltam to Israel, 2 lots x 12 pieces each in 1970 - 1975, 12 pieces to Singapore, sub-type Pore
M-68, a Soltam made 155KAN68
Philippines, Singapore, Chile, Thailand, South Africa, several hundreds. M-68 had been the main cannon for the Israeli Defence Forces
one 155KAN68 delivered to the Soviet union, barrel 10 February 1977, suspenser 11 March 1977 and launcher 9 February 1978
155HZ
155K74 developed from 155KAN68 sub-type Pore-13
155 K 83, prototype 155K74-83
155GH45T
155GH45 PAKISTAN, testing 1996-1997 in Pakistan
155K93
155HG52APU
155 K 98

Anti-tank guns
57/76 Pst
75 K/44
100 PSTK

Coastal artillery
152/50 T, a modernized version of 152 mm 45 caliber Pattern 1892
130 53 TK

Mortar
47 Krh/35
60 Krh/34
81 Krh/34
81 Krh/38
81 Krh/58P
81 Krh/71Y
120 Krh/40
120 Krh/62A-H
120 Krh/85
160 Krh/58C
300 Krh/42
B-455 81 mm mortar. Originally designed in Tampella, but manufacturing rights sold to Soltam.

See also
 Finnish Railway Museum
 VR Group
 List of Finnish locomotives
 Jokioinen Museum Railway
 List of railway museums Worldwide
 Heritage railways
 List of heritage railways
 Restored trains
 Hanko–Hyvinkää railway
 History of rail transport in Finland
 VR Class Pr1
 VR Class Hr1
 VR Class Tk3
 VR Class Hr11

References
Notes

 
Companies formerly listed on Nasdaq Helsinki